Stephanie Mayorkis (born 4 March 1971) is a Brazilian former professional tennis player.

Mayorkis reached a career high ranking of 312 in the world while competing on the professional tour. She played Federation Cup tennis for Brazil in 1992 and was unbeaten in her two singles and two doubles rubbers. In 1993 she featured in the main draw of the Curitaba WTA Tour tournament.

ITF finals

Singles: 1 (0–1)

Doubles: 3 (1–2)

References

External links
 
 
 

1971 births
Living people
Brazilian female tennis players
20th-century Brazilian women
21st-century Brazilian women